Personal Aide-de-Camp to the King (or Queen) is an appointment in the Royal Household of the United Kingdom. It is distinct from that of other aides-de-camp, in that it is only bestowed on members of the British royal family holding military rank. The appointment may be signified by the post-nominal letters 'ADC(P)'. It is an honorary role with few duties or responsibilities attached; in the 20th century the Personal Aides-de-Camp were specifically listed as riding close behind the Gold State Coach at each Coronation, and walking or riding close behind the Gun Carriage at each State Funeral, of a monarch.

History
The practice of appointing family members as Personal Aides-de-Camp was begun by Queen Victoria.

Insignia
The emblem of the office is the royal cypher and crown (of the monarch who appointed the officer), which is worn on the uniform shoulder straps; and No. 1 gold aiguillettes, which are worn on the right shoulder. (The aiguillettes of Personal Aides-de-Camp are distinguished from those of other Aides-de-Camp by the addition of the royal cypher and crown to each tag).

Current ADCs
Those in the royal family who currently hold the appointment are:

There are other categories of aides-de-camp to the Sovereign; most are serving military, naval, and air officers, usually of colonel or brigadier rank or equivalent. There are also specific posts for very senior officers, such as First and Principal Naval Aide-de-Camp, Flag Aide-de-Camp, Aide-de-Camp General, and Air Aide-de-Camp.

Former ADCs
Those in the royal family who previously held the appointment are:

See also
 Equerry
 Aide-de-camp

References

Positions within the British Royal Household